Lake Township is one of twenty townships in Allen County, Indiana, United States. As of the 2010 census, its population was 2,301.

Geography
Lake Everett is in this township.

Unincorporated towns
 Arcola at 
(This list is based on USGS data and may include former settlements.)

Adjacent townships
 Eel River Township (north)
 Washington Township (east)
 Wayne Township (southeast)
 Aboite Township (south)
 Jefferson Township, Whitley County (southwest)
 Union Township, Whitley County (west)
 Smith Township, Whitley County (northwest)

Cemeteries
The township contains Saint Patricks Cemetery.

Major highways

Airports and landing strips
 Kellys Patch Airport

School districts
 Northwest Allen County Schools

Political districts
 Indiana's 3rd congressional district
 State House District 83
 State Senate District 17

References
 United States Census Bureau 2008 TIGER/Line Shapefiles
 United States Board on Geographic Names (GNIS)
 IndianaMap

External links

Townships in Allen County, Indiana
Fort Wayne, IN Metropolitan Statistical Area
Townships in Indiana